Tamara Siamashvili Rastovac  (born July 10, 1973) is a Serbian diplomat currently serving as Serbia Permanent Representative to the United Nations Education, Scientific and Cultural Organisation (UNESCO).

Background and education 
Rastovac was born in Belgrade, Serbia. She is married with two children. She was educated at the University of Belgrade from 1992 to 1997 graduating with a degree in International Law and then proceeded to Diplomatic Academy, MFA, Belgrade in 1999.

Career 
Rastovac started her diplomatic career as an Attaché in the Directorate General for Multilateral Affairs in the Ministry of Foreign Affairs in 1999 and was moved to the Office of the Legal Adviser of the Organisation for Prohibition of Chemical Weapons in The Hague in 2001. She rose through the ranks to the position of First Secretary/Counsellor in the Permanent Mission of the Republic of Serbia to the Council of Europe, Strasbourg in 2007 and served in various capacities with Serbian foreign missions in Europe. She returned to Serbia in 2019 and was appointed Deputy Assistant Minister for Bilateral Relations and later appointed Permanent Representative to UNESCO.

References 

Serbian women diplomats
University of Belgrade alumni
Permanent Delegates of Serbia to UNESCO
Living people
1973 births